The Florida Railroad Museum  is a railroad museum located in Parrish, Florida. The museum operates a heritage railroad and offers round-trip tourist excursions along six miles of the former Seaboard Air Line Sarasota Subdivision in Manatee County between Parrish and Willow.

History
The museum was founded in 1981 as the Florida Gulf Coast Railroad Museum, and has been operating weekend excursions out of Parrish since 1992. The museum is also active in the ghost town of Willow, where it has maintenance facilities. At Willow, there is a railroad spur that leads east off of the mainline to a Florida Power & Light Company plant. CSX Transportation provides rail service to the plant. The area of Willow is accessible from Willow Road east off of US 301. The museum has a fence around its facilities at Willow and cameras for security. It has constructed a new depot at Willow within this secured property.

The railroad line that the Florida Railroad Museum uses is a very small part of a 55-mile route that was built south from Durant to Manatee County and into Sarasota with construction starting in 1895. It was first incorporated in 1902 as the United States & West Indies Railroad and Steamship Company. It became the Florida West Shore Railway on May 9, 1903. On November 4, 1909 it was acquired by the Seaboard Air Line Railroad Company. In 1967, the merger of the Seaboard Air Line and the Atlantic Coast Line created the Seaboard Coast Line. The Seaboard Coast Line would later become a part of the Family Lines System. This would lead to the Seaboard System and that would become a part of CSX Transportation in the 1980s, although the segment from Durant to Willow was pulled up in 1986. The line is currently part of the CSX Palmetto Subdivision's Parrish Spur. It is Class I track with jointed, 75-pound rails.

The Florida Railroad Museum is one of three Official State Railroad Museums in Florida. It became a Florida state railroad museum in 1984 when it received statutory recognition by the Florida Legislature as meeting the following four criteria: its purpose is to preserve railroad history, it is devoted primarily to the history of railroading, it is open to the public, and it operates as a non-profit organization. It is open Saturdays and Sundays from 10a.m. to 4p.m. year-round. The train departs from Parrish at 11a.m. and 2p.m. on these days, and the excursions from Parrish to Willow last about an hour and a half round trip. The museum also offers specials events throughout the year such as Day Out With Thomas, Pumpkin Patch Express, and North Pole Express.

Rolling stock

Locomotives

Cars

Gallery

See also

Gold Coast Railroad Museum
Royal Palm Railway Experience

References

External links
Official site

Railroad museums in Florida
Heritage railroads in Florida
Museums in Manatee County, Florida
1981 establishments in Florida